Alation is a venture-backed, B2B enterprise software company based in Silicon Valley. Its solutions are focused on data catalog, analytics, and data management.

Founded in 2012, it is credited with creating the data catalog product category. Its signature software, the Alation Data Catalog, serves enterprises in organizing and consolidating their data. Alation launched its first product in 2015 to give data consumers an easy way to search for enterprise data with natural language.

The company’s primary product, Alation Data Catalog, uses machine learning to catalog an organization’s data across cloud and on-premises file systems, databases, data lakes, and data warehouses. It has more than 450 customers including Pfizer, Cisco, Crocs, and NASDAQ.

History 
Alation was founded in 2012 by Satyen Sangani, Aaron Kalb, Feng Nui, and Venky Ganti. Alation grew out of different ideas aimed at solving the same question: How do you connect workers with questions to colleagues with answers?

Alation co-founders Satyen Sangani and Aaron Kalb arrived at the solution from two different perspectives. Sangani had a background in economics and had worked as an executive at Oracle. He knew data users in large companies struggled to find and trust data; he theorized that machine learning could be used to help them. Kalb had experience in symbolic systems and had worked on Siri at Apple. He thought crowdsourcing could be used to solve the challenge. In 2012, the team combined those two ideas to create Alation.

Its first solution, a data querying system powered by natural language processing, helped define the modern data catalog. The tool was designed to catalog data in an organization and make that data more accessible to more people. This concept is generally termed data democratization.

As the company improved the solution, it eased the building of complex queries with collaboration features, enabled data catalog efforts, and integrated with different data and related technology products, such as Snowflake, Tableau, Databricks, and others.

As of early 2021, the company had more than 250 customers, including AbbVie, American Family Insurance, Autozone, Cisco, Exelon, Finnair, Munich Re, New Balance, Pfizer, Scandinavian Airlines, and U.S. Foods. By October 2021, the company had increased that number to around 300 customers, adding GE Aviation, NASDAQ, and Regeneron, among others.

In October 2021, Alation acquired Lyngo Analytics, a data insights company which develops software to help users find insights by asking questions in simple business terms. The acquisition is intended to deepen Alation’s ability to convert natural language questions from non-technical users into SQL queries. 

In January 2022, Alation launched the “Data Radicals” podcast hosted by the company’s CEO and co-founder, Satyen Sangani. The show is designed to help business, data, and technology enthusiasts use data in powerful ways. Guests have included Stan McChrystal, retired U.S. Army General and former commander of Joint Special Operations Command in Iraq; Wendy Turner-Williams, Chief Data Officer, Tableau; Amir Efrati, co-founder and executive editor, The Information; David Epstein, TED-talker and bestselling author of “RANGE” and “The Sports Gene;” Bob Seiner, president and principal, KIK Consulting; Jennifer Belissent, principal data strategist, Snowflake; Paola Saibene, former CTO for the State of Hawaii; Cole Nussbaumer Knaflic, founder and CEO, storytelling with data; and Caroline Carruthers, CEO of Carruthers and Jackson and co-author of “The Chief Data Officer’s Playbook.”

In September 2022, Alation announced that it had achieved $100 million of annual recurring revenue (ARR). Bessemer Venture Partners, a venture capital firm, terms companies that achieve this milestone as "centaurs." The firm describes centaurs as "a rare breed of cloud business, part of an elite subset of the growing unicorn herd."

Funding 
In early March 2015, the company announced it had raised $9 million in a Series A round led by Costanoa Ventures and Data Collective. Later that month, it emerged from “stealth mode” to launch its data catalog product.

In June 2021, Alation announced it had raised a series D funding round of $110 million, led by Riverwood Capital, with participation from Sanabil Investments and Snowflake Ventures, as well as existing investors Costanoa Ventures, Dell Technologies Capital, Salesforce Ventures, and Sapphire Ventures.  This latest investment round valued the company at $1.2 billion, making it an industry unicorn.

In November 2022, Alation announced it has raised $123 million in a Series E financing led by Thoma Bravo, Sanabil Investments, and Costanoa Ventures, with participation from new investor, Databricks Ventures. Existing and other investors that also participated include Dell Technologies Capital, Hewlett Packard Enterprise (HPE), Icon Ventures, Queensland Investment Corporation, Riverwood Capital, Salesforce Ventures, Sapphire Ventures, and Union Grove. 

Alation has raised a total of $340 million and, as of its Series E funding, has a valuation of more than $1.7 billion.

Operations 
Alation is headquartered in Redwood City, CA. The company also has offices in London, U.K. and Chennai, India, and a presence in over 25 countries. As of November 2022, the company had over 700 global employees, an increase of 75% in less than 12 months.

Awards 
Alation has been recognized as a leader in the Gartner Magic Quadrant for Metadata Management Solutions for four consecutive years (2016 - 2020). In 2020, it won the Gartner Peer Insights Customers’ Choice Award.

In 2020, Alation was named a leader in The Forrester Wave: Machine Learning Data Catalogs report.
In 2021, Alation was named a leader in The Forrester Wave: Data Governance Solutions report, achieving the highest score out of twelve providers in the current offering category.

Alation has been named to the Inc. Best Workplaces list in 2019 and 2021. Alation has also been certified as a "great place to work" in 2022 by the U.K.-based Great Places To Work Institute.

In September 2022, European analyst firm BARC (Business Application Research Center) named Alation a leader in the BARC Score Data Intelligence Platforms Report due to the company's strong product strategy, roadmap, and powerful collaborative features.

References 

Software companies based in California
2012 establishments in California